Dark Water may refer to:

Books 
 Darkwater: Voices from Within the Veil, 1920 book by American philosopher W.E.B. Du Bois
 Dark Water (book) (仄暗い水の底から; Honogurai mizu no soko kara; literally In the Depths of Dark Water), a collection of horror short stories by Koji Suzuki

Films 
 Two films based on the story "Floating Water" from Suzuki's book Dark Water:
 Dark Water (2002 film), a Japanese horror film directed by Hideo Nakata
 Dark Water (2005 film), a remake of the 2002 film directed by Walter Salles
 Dark Waters (2019 film), an American legal thriller film directed by Todd Haynes
 Dark Water (Thai film), a 2007 film starring Chartchai Ngamsan

Music 
 Darkwater (band), a Progressive Metal band from Sweden
 "Dark Water" (song), a 2014 song by Amy Lee featuring Malika Zarra
 Dark Water (band), a synth wave band from Melbourne, Australia.

Television 
 Dark Water, also known as The Pirates of Dark Water, a 1990s American animated show
 "Dark Water" (Doctor Who), 2014 episode of the British TV series Doctor Who

Other uses 
 Dark Water (river), a river in the New Forest district of the English county of Hampshire
 Captain Darkwater, a character in the video game Ratchet & Clank Future: Quest for Booty

See also
 Dark Waters (disambiguation)